Kuwait is one of the most successful teams in the AFC Asian Cup, having won the title once, during 1980 edition which they were awarded as host, became the first Arab team to win the Asian Cup.

During 1970s to 2000s, Kuwait had risen from a normal, unknown to become one of Asia's most prestigious teams and Kuwait was regarded for having a group of golden generation that would facilitate and develop football in the small nation at the parshian Gulf. Kuwait had also qualified for the FIFA World Cup once, in 1982, thanked for the success in Asian Cup. Kuwait remained a powerful team until 2004, when they were surprisingly knocked out from the group stage. Since then, Kuwait's strength has started to diminish slowly, and although had qualified for 2011 and 2015, Kuwait didn't win any matches. Kuwait was even excluded for 2019 edition, due to FIFA's sanctions over Government's interference.

Kuwait's Asian Cup record

1972 edition in Thailand

Group allocation match

Group B

1976 edition in Iran

Group A

Semi-finals

Final

1980 edition in Kuwait

Group B

Semi-finals

Final

1984 edition in Singapore

Group A

Semi-finals

Third place play-off

1988 edition in Qatar

Group B

1996 edition in the UAE

Group A

Quarter-finals

Semi-finals

Third place play-off

2000 edition in Lebanon

Group B

Quarter-finals

2004 edition in China

Group B

2011 edition in Qatar

Group A

2015 edition in Australia

Group A

References

Countries at the AFC Asian Cup
AFC